Cameron Bell (born 18 September 1986) is a Scottish football coach and former player. Bell played as a goalkeeper for several Scottish clubs and once for the Scotland national team.

Bell began his senior career with Kilmarnock and, after loan spells with Montrose and Queen of the South, went on to play over 100 matches for the club and win the Scottish League Cup in 2012. He represented Scotland once, in 2010.

Bell joined Rangers in 2013, helping them to the Scottish League One title in his first season. He played for Dundee United during the 2016–17 season, saving three penalty kicks in one match against Dunfermline.

He then had short spells with Kilmarnock, Hibernian, Partick Thistle, St. Johnstone, Falkirk and Queen's Park before his retirement. He briefly worked as Director of Football at hometown club Annan Athletic.

Club career

Early years
Bell was born in Dumfries and was on the books of local club Queen of the South as a youngster and was also part of the youth set up at Annan Athletic. Bell moved from Queens to Kilmarnock in 2002. In 2006, he extended his contract with Kilmarnock although he had not yet appeared for the first team.

In the 2006–07 season Bell had a spell on loan at Montrose, getting a taste of first team football. Kilmarnock manager Jim Jefferies said in November 2007 that he was prepared to allow Bell to go out on loan once he had fully recovered from a cruciate injury. Bell recalled how this injury affected his career, saying that the club doctor at Kilmarnock believed he might never play again.

In July 2008, Bell was loaned out by Kilmarnock to his home town club Queen of the South, having been in the Queens squad as a trialist for their two previous pre-season matches. Bell made his debut for Queens on 17 August 2008, at Palmerston Park in a 2–0 win against Partick Thistle. He retained his place to make his European debut in the second leg of the UEFA Cup second qualification round game against FC Nordsjælland on 26 August. Following a match against Livingston, which Queen of the South won 6–1 on 4 October 2008, Bell was involved in an incident in a Dumfries bar, which resulted in a broken jaw, but he managed to recover two weeks later. The last of his 15 league games for QoS, a 2–1 home defeat by Dunfermline Athletic, was on 13 December 2008. Bell soon suffered an injury, damaging discs in his back. After this, he returned to Kilmarnock.

Kilmarnock

2009–10 season
Bell made his debut for Kilmarnock in the final game of the 2008–09 season, a 2–1 win over Motherwell. At the end the season, he signed a new one-year contract with the club. After signing the new deal, Kilmarnock manager Jim Jefferies hinted that Bell faced a battle in order to become the club's first choice goalkeeper. Bell played in the first two games of the 2009–10 season for Kilmarnock in place of injured first choice goalkeeper Alan Combe. Mark Brown was then brought in on loan from Celtic to cover for Combe, but when he returned to his parent club in January 2010, Bell then became the established first choice goalkeeper for Kilmarnock. On 2 February 2010, Bell played as Kilmarnock beat Celtic 1–0. After the match, newly appointed Kilmarnock manager Jimmy Calderwood praised Bell, describing his performance as 'fabulous'. At the end of the 2009–10 season, his contract was extended as he had met a clause in his deal signed the previous summer that if he started enough games during the season, it would trigger an automatic renewal.

2010–11 season
Bell remained first pick for the start of the 2010–11 season, with his performances attracting attention from Scotland manager Craig Levein. In November 2010, manager Mixu Paatelainen said he had started negotiating a new contract for Bell and said he believed Bell should stay and remain as a first choice goalkeeper, rather than move on, believing his career would greatly decline, having been linked with Aberdeen and Rangers. Soon after, Bell was left out of the line-up unexpectedly over a dispute on a new deal, which appeared to be rejected by Bell and also led to a fallout between him and Paatelainen. The following month, the club made their last chance effort to keep Bell, with another new contract offer. Bell then returned to the line-up and would keep his place until the end of the season. In May 2011, with Paatelainen having left Kilmarnock, Bell said he made amend with the club and was ready to sign a new deal. He also spoke about how he felt that being dropped by Paatelainen had cost him his place in the Scotland squad and that he wasn't treated fairly at the club.

2011–12 season
Ahead of the 2011–12 season, clubs including St Mirren and AaB were linked with signing Bell. Eventually, under new manager Kenny Shiels, who had previously been Paatelainen's assistant manager, Bell was persuaded to stay at the club, signing a new two-year contract. He said his decision to sign wasn't a financial one, having rejected clubs in South Africa, Denmark and England.

Bell played the first ten games of the season, before suffering an elbow injury in mid-October. While sidelined, Bell went to a specialist to have injections to end his injury. On 18 March 2012, Bell played in the 2012 Scottish League Cup Final which Kilmarnock won after beating Celtic 1–0. Bell was awarded the Man of the Match award, pulling off several stunning saves.

2012–13 season
Early in the 2012–13 season, Bell suffered a wrist injury during a 2–1 loss against Motherwell which was expected to keep him out for ten weeks . Following surgery, Bell said he would be back in six weeks, instead of the original ten. After two months on the sidelines, he made a return to training. Week after making a recovery, Bell was in goal on 28 October 2012, when Kilmarnock earned a historic win at Celtic Park against Celtic, the victory was Kilmarnock's first win in the East End of Glasgow for 57 years. However, on his next appearance, Bell received a straight red card when he fouled an opposition player in the penalty box, as Kilmarnock lost 2–1 to Inverness Caledonian Thistle. After the match, the club immediately appealed against his sending off, and were victorious with this, making him available for the next game.

During the season, transfer speculation around Bell continued, and it was then reported that would sign a new five-year deal with Kilmarnock. However, in an unexpected turn of an event, he revealed he was yet to sign a contract with the club and he also said his agent had been talking with other clubs on his behalf. Kenny shiels then claimed that English club Ipswich Town were interested in signing Bell, this was denied by their manager Mick McCarthy however.

Rangers
On 7 April 2013, Bell signed a pre-contract with Rangers. Throughout the 2012–13 season, Bell had been linked with Rangers several times as his contract was due to expire at the end of the season. Bell made his Rangers debut on 31 August 2013, against East Fife playing as a trialist as the club's new signings couldn't be registered until 1 September 2013, due to their transfer embargo. He became the first choice goalkeeper and played regularly as Rangers won the Scottish League One title.

Bell suffered a shoulder injury in August 2014. The injury kept him out of action for the rest of the year and prompted Rangers to sign another goalkeeper, Lee Robinson. Rangers finished third in the Championship and reached the play-off final for promotion to the Scottish Premiership, but lost 6–1 on aggregate to Motherwell. Bell made an error for the first Motherwell goal in the second leg of the tie.

In the 2015–16 season, with Bell out injured, new signing Wes Foderingham became the first-choice Rangers goalkeeper under the management of Mark Warburton. Bell did not make any first team appearances for Rangers during the season and left the club by mutual consent during the close season.

Dundee United
Bell signed for Dundee United on 22 June 2016 on a two-year contract. In a league game against Dunfermline on 10 September 2016, Bell achieved the unusual feat of saving three penalty kicks in the same game. Bell left United in August 2017, by mutual consent.

Kilmarnock (second spell)
Bell returned to Kilmarnock in August 2017, signing a two-year contract. He left by mutual consent in January 2018, having made no first team appearance in his second spell at the club.

Hibernian
Bell signed for Hibernian on 31 January 2018. He made his first appearance for Hibs on 16 March, coming on as a substitute in a 1–1 draw with St Johnstone after Ofir Marciano had been sent off. Bell also played in the following game, a 2–0 win against Partick Thistle, as Marciano was suspended. He was released by Hibs in May 2018, at the end of his contract.

Partick Thistle
In June 2018, Bell signed a two-year contract with Scottish Championship club Partick Thistle. Bell started as first choice goalkeeper, but subsequently fell behind Conor Hazard and Jamie Sneddon in the pecking order.

St Johnstone loan
In January 2019, Bell was loaned to St. Johnstone, where he was made second choice goalkeeper, behind Zander Clark.

Falkirk
Bell signed for League One club Falkirk in June 2019. He was initially the first choice goalkeeper, but he suffered an injury and then lost his place to Robbie Mutch. Bell left Falkirk in January 2020.

Queen's Park
League Two club Queen's Park signed Bell in February 2020. He struggled with injury and was then unable to earn a place in the club's starting lineup. Bell announced his retirement from playing football on 1 December 2020.

International career
Bell was first called up to the senior Scotland squad on 4 October 2010 for the European Championship qualifiers against the Czech Republic and Spain, after Matt Gilks dropped out through injury. He made his Scotland debut, as a 68th-minute substitute replacing Craig Gordon, against the Faroe Islands on 16 November 2010 in a 3–0 friendly win at Pittodrie Stadium in Aberdeen. He injured his arm during October 2011 in Spain after he saved from a David Goodwillie shot in training and later complained about pain. A scan showed he had damaged tendons. Bell was again called up to the Scotland squad for a friendly against Luxembourg in November 2012.

Coaching career
Annan Athletic appointed Bell as their director of football in December 2020. He resigned from the role at the end of the 2020/21 season.

Career statistics

Club

International

Honours

Club
Kilmarnock
 Scottish League Cup: 2011–12

Rangers
 Scottish League One: 2013–14 
 Scottish Championship: 2015–16 
 Scottish Challenge Cup: 2015–16

Dundee United
 Scottish Challenge Cup: 2016-17

Individual
 PFA Scotland League One Team of the Year (1): 2013–14
 Scottish Championship Player of the Month (1): September 2016

References

External links

 Montrose appearances

1986 births
Living people
Footballers from Dumfries
Scottish footballers
Scotland international footballers
Association football goalkeepers
Kilmarnock F.C. players
Montrose F.C. players
Queen of the South F.C. players
Rangers F.C. players
Scottish Premier League players
Scottish Football League players
Scottish Professional Football League players
Dundee United F.C. players
Hibernian F.C. players
Partick Thistle F.C. players
St Johnstone F.C. players
Falkirk F.C. players
Queen's Park F.C. players